Fünf Gesänge (Five songs), Op. 104, is a song cycle of five part songs for mixed choir a cappella by Johannes Brahms.  Composed in 1888 when Brahms was a 55-year-old bachelor, the five songs reflect an intensely nostalgic and even tragic mood. Brahms has chosen texts which centre on lost youth, summer turning into fall and, ultimately, man's mortality. While the score and the parts themselves are not that difficult for the singers, the sombre nature of the texts coupled with intense soaring melodies and complex harmonies make it quite a demanding work for any choir.

Songs 
The songs are set for a choir of four to six voices, SATB to SAATBB

Recordings 

 NDR Chor, conducted by Günter Jena – Deutsche Grammophon, 1983
 Monteverdi Choir, conducted by John Eliot Gardiner – Philips, 1992
 Kammerchor Stuttgart, conducted by Frieder Bernius – Sony, 1995
 Chamber Choir of Europe, conducted by Nicol Matt – Brilliant, 2003
 Cappella Amsterdam, conducted by Daniel Reuss – Harmonia Mundi, 2014

External links 
 Fünf Gesänge op.104 (Brahms): Free scores at the Brahms Institut.
 
 Fünf Gesänge op.104 (Brahms): Free MP3s (op. 42, op. 93a, op. 104 and op. 52)
 Detailed Listening Guide using the recording by the NDR Chor

Choral compositions
Song cycles by Johannes Brahms
1888 compositions